Cantú (Spanish version), Cantù (Italian version), Cantu (Anglicised version) is a surname of Italian/Spanish origin. The name may refer to:

Ana Cecilia Cantu (born 1985), Mexican figure skater
Carlo Adolfo Cantù (1875–1942), Italian composer
Cesare Cantù (1804–1895), Italian historian
Egidio Torre Cantú (born 1957), Mexican politician
Eloy Cantú Segovia (born 1952), Mexican politician
Federico Cantú Garza (1907–1989), Mexican chef
Guillermo Cantú (born 1968), Mexican football player
Guillermo García Cantú (born 1960), Mexican actor
Hector Cantú (born 1961), American writer
Homaro Cantu (1976–2015), American chef
Jorge Cantú (born 1982), Mexican baseball player
Laura Martel Cantú (born 1985), Mexican politician 
Lionel Cantú (1965–2002), American sociologist
Michele Cantú (born 1988), Mexican figure skater
Norma Elia Cantú (born 1947), American writer
Norma V. Cantu (born 1954), American lawyer
Oscar Cantú (born 1966), American bishop 
Paty Cantú (born 1983), Mexican singer
Rachael Cantu (born 1981), American singer-songwriter
Rodolfo Torre Cantú (1964–2010), Mexican politician
Rolando Cantu (born 1981), Mexican football player
 Sandra Cantu (2001-2009), American murder victim
Vidal Cantu (born 1968), Mexican film producer

References

Italian-language surnames
Surnames of Italian origin
Spanish-language surnames
Surnames of Spanish origin